The End of the Road is a 1936 British musical comedy drama film directed by Alex Bryce and starring Harry Lauder, Bruce Seton, Ruth Haven and Ethel Glendinning.  It was made at Wembley Studios by the British subsidiary of the Hollywood company Twentieth Century Fox.

Plot
After she marries a drunken wastrel, the daughter of the manager at a Scottish concert party is thrown out by him.

Cast
 Harry Lauder as John MacGregor
 Ruth Haven as Sheila MacGregor
 Ethel Glendinning as Jean MacGregor
 Bruce Seton as Donald Carson
 Margaret Moffatt as Maggie
 Campbell Gullan as David
 Vera Lennox as Flo
 Johnnie Schofield as Jock
 Tully Comber as Alan Cameron

References

Bibliography
 Wood, Linda. British Films, 1929-1939. British Film Institute, 1986.

External links

1936 films
1930s musical comedy-drama films
British musical comedy-drama films
Films directed by Alex Bryce
Films shot at Wembley Studios
Films with screenplays by Edward Dryhurst
British black-and-white films
1936 comedy films
1936 drama films
1930s English-language films
1930s British films